43 Bridge Street is an undercroft and shop in Chester, Cheshire, England.  It is recorded in the National Heritage List for England as a designated Grade II* listed building. It is also known as St Michael's Rectory.

History

The building was originally a town house, but in 1659, soon after it was built, it was bequeathed to the parish of St Michael for use as a rectory.  It ceased to be used as a rectory in 1907, and was converted into a shop by an antique dealer named Crawford. It was restored in the late 20th century.

Architecture

Constructed in timber framing with plaster panels, the shop has a grey slate roof.  It has four storeys, and consists of a single, narrow bay.  A portion of the Chester Rows passes through the first floor.  At street level is a modern shop front, behind which is the former undercroft.  At the front of the first floor is a rail on balusters, behind which is a stallboard, the paved walkway of the Row, and a modern shop front.  Above this is a row of five ornately shaped panels.  The second floor contains a three-light mullioned and transomed casement window, with two panels on each side.  The top storey is jettied and gabled.  It contains a row of six plain panels, above which is a small three-light casement window with two panels on each side, and a queen post gable with patterned bargeboards and a finial. The interior has retained part of a 17th-century moulded ceiling, the form of the galleried former great hall, and an 18th-century staircase.  In also contains four panels depicting the Stations of the Cross.  These appear to be medieval, but are in fact plaster panels painted to resemble wood that were installed by Crawford when the rectory was converted into a shop.

Current use

As of October 2012 the building is occupied by previously Porr's Collection costume jewellery. As of November 2013 is now 2 Good 2 B True fashion Jewellery and accessories shop at street level and by Mad Hatters Tea Room & Bakery at row level and above.

See also

Grade II* listed buildings in Cheshire

References

43 Bridge Street
Grade II* listed buildings in Chester
Timber framed buildings in Cheshire
Medieval architecture
Shops in Chester